Jeffrey Lee Query (born March 7, 1967) is a former American football wide receiver in the National Football League (NFL) for the Green Bay Packers, Cincinnati Bengals, and Washington Redskins.  Query played college football at Millikin University. The Green Bay Packers selected Query in the fifth round of the 1989 NFL Draft.  Query also returned punts while playing for the Packers, and was awarded the title of the NFL's Fastest Man in both 1989 and 1990 seasons. Query was the first NFL player to be drafted out of Millikin.

References

External links
 

Living people
1967 births
Sportspeople from Decatur, Illinois
American football wide receivers
Green Bay Packers players
Cincinnati Bengals players
Washington Redskins players
Millikin Big Blue football players